Jamaine Jones is a professional Australian rules footballer for the West Coast Eagles in the Australian Football League (AFL). He is a small forward. Jones debuted in round 10, 2018 against Carlton at Kardinia Park, and scored a goal with his first kick. 

Jones was born in Broken Hill and was raised in a group home in Mildura. Aged 10, he was adopted by Sue Lovett and moved to Geelong where he played football for Belmont. Jones later moved to Heywood and won a 2015 premiership with its local club aged 16. He studied at Heywood District Secondary College, and later played for the North Ballarat Rebels. Jones said that he "didn't take footy too seriously" and was told by Talent Manager Phil Partington that he "wasn't going to make it" after struggling in his first year in the TAC Cup, but said the remark made him stronger for his second year.  

Jones was noticed by Geelong recruiter Stephen Wells after a best-on-ground performance in an inter-league match with Hampden League. He was drafted by Geelong with their last pick (number 48) in the 2017 AFL rookie draft – a pick described by coach Chris Scott as "as speculative as they come". Jones played in the 2018 JLT Community Series and was selected in Geelong's senior side after strong form in the Victorian Football League (VFL).

Jones was delisted shortly after Geelong's preliminary final loss to Richmond in 2019, and in March 2020 was signed to the  during the supplementary selection period (SSP).

References

External links 

 
 

Living people
1998 births
Greater Western Victoria Rebels players
Geelong Football Club players
Australian rules footballers from Victoria (Australia)
People from Broken Hill, New South Wales
Indigenous Australian players of Australian rules football
West Coast Eagles players
West Coast Eagles (WAFL) players